Pandit Swapan Chaudhuri (born 30 March 1945), is an Indian tabla player. He has accompanied several musicians of Indian classical music, including, Pandit Ravi Shankar, Ustad Ali Akbar Khan, Ustad Vilayat Khan, Pandit Bhimshen Joshi, Pandit Jasraj., Ustad Amjad Ali Khan and many more. He also taught his sons tabla.

Awards 
He received American Academy of Artists Award and was nominee to Percussive Arts Society Hall of Fame. In 1996, Swapan Chaudhuri received the Sangeet Natak Academy Award from the President of India, the highest awards for Classical Music in India. In 2019, he received the Padma Shri, one of India's highest honor from the Indian government.

See also
Zakir Hussain
Shankar Ghosh
Chandra Nath Shastri
Anindo Chatterjee
Kumar Bose
Yogesh Samsi
Ravi Shankar

References

External links
 faculty webpage at California Institute of the Arts

Hindustani instrumentalists
Living people
Recipients of the Sangeet Natak Akademi Award
Tabla players
Jadavpur University alumni
Indian percussionists
California Institute of the Arts faculty
Indian music educators
Recipients of the Padma Shri in arts
1945 births
Recipients of the Sangeet Natak Akademi Fellowship